Kőszegszerdahely is a village in Vas county, in the district of Kőszeg, 5 km-s from the Hungarian-Austrian border (Bozsok-Rohonc border crossing).

Location 

Kőszegszerdahely is located in western Hungary. Neighboring settlements: Bozsok, Velem, Cák, Kőszegdoroszló and Perenye.

Transport

Roads 

The village is the center of the local road network of Kőszeghegyalja (Kőszeg Foothills), which is connected to the Szombathely-Kőszeg secondary main road (Main Road 87).

Distance from airports

Population

20th Century

From 1990

History 

There was a market place in the place of the village already before the Mongol invasion. In the Middle Ages, villages belonged to a castle or a lordship.

In 1532, Turkish troops besieging Kőszeg together with the other villages in the area burned down Kőszegszerdahely. The inhabitants of the villages fled to the Castle of Kőszeg and, together with the citizens of Kőszeg, led by Captain Miklós Jurisich, stopped the Turks.

Sights

All Saints Church

Ethnographic Exhibition

Wine cellars

Ereszténymajor 

Here is a 120 years old Cedrus atlantica.

Famous people 

 Lakner, Tamás. Conductor, guitarist, music teacher, leader of the Szélkiáltó band.
 Seregély, István. Archbishop. From 1974 to 1981 was priest in Kőszegszerdahely.
 Jagodics, Zoltán. Five times a member of the Hungarian national football team.

References

External links 
 Street map 

Populated places in Vas County